This page shows the progress of Gillingham in the 2012–13 season. This season they will play their league games in Football League Two, the fourth tier of English football.

This was the season Gillingham had won their first League Championship in nearly 50 years, finishing 1st in League Two after a 2–2 draw with AFC Wimbledon in the penultimate match of the season.

Results

Pre-season

League Two

FA Cup

League Cup

League Trophy

League Two

League table

Results summary

Squad statistics

Appearances and goals

|-
|colspan="14"|Players featured for club who have left:

 

|}

Goalscoring record

Transfers

In

Loans in

Out

Loans out

References

Gillingham F.C. seasons
Gillingham
2010s in Kent